Roman Romanov may refer to:

 Roman Romanov (Lithuanian businessman) (born 1976)
 Roman Romanov (Ukrainian businessman) (born 1972)
 Roman Romanov (footballer, born 1981), Russian football player
 Roman Romanov (footballer, born 2003), Russian football player